Shawn Ellen LaGrua (born 1962) is an associate justice of the Georgia Supreme Court.

Education 

LaGrua received a Bachelor of Arts in Political Science from the University of Georgia in 1984, and received her Juris Doctor from Georgia State University College of Law in 1987.

Legal and academic career 

After her graduation from law school, from 1987 to 1990 she served as an assistant district attorney for DeKalb County; from 1992 to 1999 she as the Senior Assistant District Attorney for Fulton County, from 1999 to 2001 she served as the Chief Assistant District Attorney for the Tallapoosa Circuit. From 2004 to 2007 she served as a Solicitor General for DeKalb County, Georgia. Prior to her elevation to the bench from 2007 to 2010 she was the Inspector General for the Georgia Secretary of State. She is also an adjunct professor at Georgia State University College of Law.

Judicial career

Superior Court of Fulton County 

She was appointed as a Judge of the Fulton Superior Court in 2010.

Georgia Supreme Court 

LaGrua was one of four finalists being considered for the vacancy. On December 1, 2020, Governor Brian Kemp announced his appointment of LaGrua to be an associate justice of the Supreme Court of Georgia to the seat vacated by Justice Keith R. Blackwell who resigned on November 18, 2020. She was sworn into office on January 7, 2021.

References

External links 

Living people
Place of birth missing (living people)
20th-century American lawyers
20th-century American women lawyers
21st-century American lawyers
21st-century American judges
District attorneys in Georgia (U.S. state)
Georgia (U.S. state) lawyers
Georgia (U.S. state) state court judges
Georgia State University faculty
Georgia State University College of Law alumni
Justices of the Supreme Court of Georgia (U.S. state)
Superior court judges in the United States
University of Georgia alumni
American women academics
1962 births
21st-century American women judges